Bash-Berkutovo (Baş-Börköt) is a rural locality (a village) in Maxyutovsky Selsoviet, Kugarchinsky District, Bashkortostan, Russia. The population was 2 as of 2010. There is 1 street.

Geography 
Bash-Berkutovo is located 55 km south of Mrakovo (the district's administrative centre) by road. Berkutovo is the nearest rural locality.

References 

Rural localities in Kugarchinsky District